Gary Steven Wilson (born November 21, 1954) is a former relief pitcher in Major League Baseball who played briefly for the Houston Astros in the 1979 season. Listed at 6' 2", 185 lb., Wilson batted and threw right handed. He was born in Camden, Arkansas.

External links
, or Retrosheet, or Pelota Binaria (Venezuelan Winter League)

1954 births
Living people
Baseball players from Arkansas
Cardenales de Lara players
American expatriate baseball players in Venezuela
Charleston Charlies players
Columbus Astros players
Dubuque Packers players
Houston Astros players
Kinston Blue Jays players
Knoxville Blue Jays players
Major League Baseball pitchers
People from Camden, Arkansas
Southern Arkansas Muleriders baseball players
Syracuse Chiefs players
Tucson Toros players
Wichita Aeros players